Kenneth Kurtz (born February 15, 1947) is a Republican politician from Michigan who was a member of the Michigan House of Representatives from 2009 until 2014.

Kurtz owned and operated three funeral homes in the Coldwater area, and was pastor of United Brethren Church in that town. He has served on several community boards and is a member of several local organizations.

References

1947 births
Living people
Republican Party members of the Michigan House of Representatives
Politicians from Kalamazoo, Michigan
People from Coldwater, Michigan
21st-century American politicians